Şükrü Sina Gürel (born 1 January 1950 in Izmir; transliterated as Sukru Sina Gurel) is a Turkish diplomat and political figure who served as the nation's foreign minister in mid-2002.

A native of İzmir and a member of the Democratic Left Party (DSP), Gürel represented his country at the Council of Europe from 22 April 1996 to 26 January 1998. He became foreign minister following the resignation of his predecessor, İsmail Cem on 10 July 2002. Later in the year he ceded the office to Yaşar Yakış. Gürel returned to active politics by joining the Victory Party on April 19, 2022. 

He is Director of Foreign Affairs at Victory Party's Board. 
He is working closesly with Prof.Dr.Ümit Ozdag.

Bibliography
Tarihsel Boyutları İçinde: TÜRK - YUNAN İLİŞKİLERİ (1821 - 1993) (Turkish for Turkish-Greek relations), Ümit Yayıncılık, Ankara, 1993. Also translated in Greek (from the original Turkish) in 2008 as Οι Τουρκο-Ελληνικές σχέσεις (1821 - 1993) by Παντελής Τουλουμάκος (Pandelis Touloumakos).

References

1950 births
Living people
People from İzmir
Democratic Left Party (Turkey) politicians
Ministers of Foreign Affairs of Turkey
Deputies of Izmir
Bornova Anadolu Lisesi alumni
Ankara University Faculty of Political Sciences alumni
Members of the 21st Parliament of Turkey
Members of the 20th Parliament of Turkey
Members of the 56th government of Turkey
Members of the 57th government of Turkey
Ministers of State of Turkey